

Hemele (or Hemel) was a medieval Bishop of Lichfield. He was consecrated before 757 and died in 765.

Citations

References

External links
 

765 deaths
8th-century English bishops
Anglo-Saxon bishops of Lichfield
Year of birth unknown